Sis or SIS may refer to:

People

Michael Sis (born 1960), American Catholic bishop

Places 

 Sis (ancient city), historical town in modern-day Turkey, served as the capital of the Armenian Kingdom of Cilicia.
 Kozan, Adana, the current name of the Armenian town of Sis in Cilicia, Turkey
 Sis, Armenia, a village in Armenia
 Sis, Azerbaijan, a village in the Republic of Azerbaijan
 Sis, Iran, a city in East Azerbaijan, Iran
 Sis, Kurdistan, a village in Kurdistan, Iran
 Sis Rural District (Shabestar County), East Azerbaijan province, Iran
 Sis Rural District (Kurdistan Province), in Iran
 Mountains of Sis, a range of the Pre-Pyrenees

Intelligence 
 Schengen Information System, in Europe
 Security Information Service, Czech domestic information intelligence agency known as BIS
 Secret Intelligence Service, UK intelligence agency, also known as MI6
 Australian Secret Intelligence Service, Australia’s national intelligence service
 Canadian Security Intelligence Service, Canada's national intelligence service
 New Zealand Security Intelligence Service, an intelligence agency of the New Zealand government
 Finnish Security Intelligence Service, the intelligence agency of Finland in charge of national security
 Slovenská informačná služba, Slovak Intelligence Service
 Special Intelligence Service, a secret FBI intelligence agency operating in South America during World War II
 Signals Intelligence Service, the former United States Army codebreaking division
 Information and Security Service of the Republic of Moldova, the principal intelligence agency of Moldova.
 Serviço de Informações de Segurança, a Portuguese intelligence agency
 Survey of India Service, formerly the Great Trigonometric Survey
 Special Investigation Section, a tactical detective and surveillance unit of the Los Angeles Police Department
 Signals Intelligence Section, involved with the Magic project during World War II

Businesses 
 Silicon Integrated Systems, an electronics manufacturing company
 Satellite Information Services, a news service company
 Siemens IT Solutions and Services, a service provider which is part of Siemens AG headquarters
 SIS (motorbikes), a Portuguese manufacturer of motorcycles

Schools

China 
 Shekou International School, in Shekou
 Singapore International School, in Hong Kong
 South Island School, in Hong Kong

United States 
 School of International Service, American University, Washington, D.C.
 Syracuse University School of Information Studies
 University of Pittsburgh School of Information Sciences

Other schools 
 SIS Swiss International School, a group of 15 private day schools in Switzerland, Germany and Brazil
 McGill University School of Information Studies, Canada
 School of International Studies of the Dresden University of Technology, Germany
 Singapore International School Mumbai, India
 Surabaya International School, Indonesia
 Seoul International School, South Korea
 Stockholm International School, Sweden
 Sharjah Indian School, United Arab Emirates

Other organizations 
 Sisters in Islam, an organization based in Malaysia
 Swedish Institute for Standards
 Specialized Information Services, a division of the United States National Library of Medicine
 State Information Service, official media and public relations apparatus of the Egyptian state

Information processing 
 SIS (file format), Symbian OS filename extension 
 Short integer solution problem, a problem in lattice-based cryptography
 Single-instance storage, information-storage space-saving mechanism
 Strategic information system, a part of corporate strategy
 Student information system, a software application for education establishments to manage student data
 Sequential Importance Sampling

Biological sciences 
 Small intestinal submucosa, transplantation tissue
 Second-impact syndrome, synergy in concussions
 Sex in space, an area of biological research

Healthcare 
 Saline infusion sonography, a test used to diagnose uterine polyps
 Shoulder impingement syndrome, tendinitis of the shoulder

Technologies 
 Selective inverted sink, frost protection device 
 Safety instrumented system or safety instrumentation system
 Space Infrastructure Servicing, a robotic spacecraft for in-space refueling of communication satellites

Other uses 
 SIS (group), South Korean girl group founded 2017
 SiS (TV series), a morning talk show
 SIS, a 2008 television film directed by John Herzfeld
 Supervised injection site
 , car ferry

See also
 Sister, a female sibling
 Sissy, a pejorative term for a boy or man who violates or does not meet the traditional male gender role
 Shimano Index Shifting, bicycle transmission design
 Single-image stereogram
 Superconductor-insulator-superconductor tunnel junction
 Swedish National Board of Institutional Care, abbreviated SiS
 SIS 18, an accelerator at the GSI Helmholtz Centre for Heavy Ion Research
 Special Investigations Section (disambiguation)